Ballophilus maldivensis is a species of centipede in the genus Ballophilus. It is found in the Maldives.

References 

Ballophilidae
Fauna of the Maldives
Animals described in 1906